Ali Rahnema (born 1952) is an Iranian economist and historian. He is a professor of economics at the American University of Paris. Rahnema is the son of former Iranian diplomat and politician Hamid Rahnema.

Education
Rahnema has a BA from Lewis and Clark College, MA and MALD degrees from The Fletcher School of Law and Diplomacy of Tufts University, and a Doctorat de Troisième Cycle from the  Université de Paris I - Sorbonne.

Books

See also
 Religious intellectualism in Iran
 Sources of sharia
 Movement of God-Worshipping Socialists

References

1952 births
Living people
Iranian sociologists
Iranian economists
Iranian historians of religion
Academic staff of the American University of Paris
Sociologists of religion
The Fletcher School at Tufts University alumni
Lewis & Clark College alumni
Scholars of Islamic banking
Date of birth missing (living people)
Place of birth missing (living people)